James Stone (29 November 1876 – 15 November 1942) was an English first-class cricketer. A wicketkeeper, he played for both Hampshire and Glamorgan.

Stone was the first choice keeper for Hampshire from 1900 until 1914 before the war intervened. Following the war he moved to Wales and in 1923, his final year of first-class cricket, Stone scored the first ever century by a Glamorgan batsman against a touring team. His innings of 108 was made against the West Indies and he was 46 years of age.

After retiring, Stone became a first-class cricket umpire. He quit umpiring in 1934 and died 8 years later in Berkshire.

Notes

1876 births
1942 deaths
English cricketers
Hampshire cricketers
Glamorgan cricketers
English cricket umpires
Berkshire cricketers
East of England cricketers
Players of the South cricketers
Wicket-keepers